Terry Adolph was an American professional basketball player. He graduated from West Texas A&M in 1981 where he was a point guard. He played for two seasons at West Texas A&M, playing in a total of 57 games. In his senior year his record included a 43.7% field goal attempt and a 77.4% free throw record. He was selected by the Golden State Warriors in the 4th round (80th pick) of the NBA Draft on June 9, 1981. In 1981 he was the recipient of the Frances Pomeroy Naismith Award. Adolph was born in Los Angeles, California.

References

External links
 Terry Adolph at RealGM

American men's basketball players
African-American basketball players
Point guards
Portland State Vikings men's basketball players
West Texas A&M Buffaloes basketball players
Golden State Warriors draft picks
Basketball players from Los Angeles